The 2005 Asian Canoe Sprint Championships was the 11th Asian Canoe Sprint Championships and took place from December 17–20, 2005 in Putrajaya, Malaysia.

Medal summary

Men

Women

Medal table

References

Results

Canoe Sprint Championships
Asian Canoe Sprint Championships
Asian Canoeing Championships
International sports competitions hosted by Malaysia